"Love Yourself" is a song recorded by American singer Mary J. Blige featuring rapper Kanye West. It was written by Blige, West, Charles Hinshaw, David D. Brown, Darhyl "DJ" Camper, Jr. for her thirteenth studio album, Strength of a Woman (2017), while production was helmed by the latter. The song contains samples from "Nobody Knows" (1970) by The SCLC Operation Breadbasket Orchestra And Choir. Due to the inclusion of the sample, I. Andrews is also credited as a songwriter. "Love Yourself" released on March 30, 2017, as the third single from Strength of a Woman.

Music video
The music video for the official remix of "Love Yourself" featuring Harlem rapper ASAP Rocky premiered via Complex on May 26, 2017. It was directed by Taj and was shot in Los Angeles and New York City. The video was uploaded to Blige's official Vevo channel on June 9, 2017.

Credits and personnel 
Credits adapted from the liner notes of Strength of a Woman.

I. Andrews – writer (sample)
Mary J. Blige – vocals, writer
David D. Brown – writer
Marshall Bryant – recording
Darhyl Camper, Jr. – writer
Jaymz Hardy-Martin III – recording
Charles Hinshaw – writer
David Kim – mixing assistant 
Jon Nettlesbey – recording assistant 
Kanye West – writer

Charts

Weekly charts

Year-end charts

Release history

References

2017 singles
2017 songs
Mary J. Blige songs
Capitol Records singles
Songs written by Mary J. Blige
Songs written by Kanye West
Songs written by Darhyl Camper